Rebound is an upcoming South Korean sports drama film directed by Jang Hang-jun. Kim Eun-hee with Kwon Seong-hui wrote the screenplay based on the true story of coach Kang Yang-hyeon and Busan Joongang High School's basketball team, who made it to the national championship finals in 2012 with only 6 players and no substitutes. Ahn Jae-hong is playing coach Kang with Lee Shin-young, Jeong Jin-woon and Jung Gun-joo featured as players. It is slated for release theatrically in South Korea on April 5, 2023.

Synopsis
Once a renowned basketball team of Joong-Ang High School is now in shambles. A former minor league baseball player Kang Yang-hyeon becomes the head coach, but the left over players will not play under a novice  coach. The coach Kang prepares a ragtag team of sports misfits and push them to their limits. Six members agree to return for the love of the game and play in the KBA National Tournament. Following coach's motto: "There is no such thing as missed shots, there are only rebounds!". They begin knocking on victory's door, and that's how the miracle journey of  begins.

Cast 

Joongang High School's basketball team

 Ahn Jae-hong as Coach Kang Yang-hyeon
 Lee Shin-young as Cheon Ki-beom, captain 
 Jeong Jin-woon as Bae Gyoo-hyeok
 Jung Gun-joo as Jung Kang-ho
 Ahn Ji-ho as Jung Jin-wook
 Kim Taek as Hong Soon-gyoo
 Kim Min as Heo Jae-yoon, sixth man

Others

 Lee Jun-hyeok as Head coach
 Roh Kyung as basketball coach from another school

Production
The production team of BA Entertainment, who are producing Crime City film series, were fascinated by news report about the basketball team of Busan Central High School, so they prepared for a film adaptation for about 10 years. Kim Eun-hee joined hands with screenwriter Kwon Sung-hui, to write a script for the film. The cast of Ahn Jae-hong,  as coach Kang Yang-hyeon with Lee Shin-young, Jeong Jin-woon, Jung Gun-joo, Ahn Ji-ho Kim Taek, and Kim Min as players was finalized in February 2022. Training began in March 2022 and filming thereafter.

The film was wrapped up on July 29, 2022, after 3 months of filming.

References

External links
 
 
 

2023 films
2020s sports drama films
2020s South Korean films
2020s Korean-language films
South Korean sports drama films
Films set in 2012
South Korean films based on actual events